La Crosse is a city in the U.S. state of Wisconsin and the county seat of La Crosse County. Positioned alongside the Mississippi River, La Crosse is the largest city on Wisconsin's western border. La Crosse's population as of the 2020 census was 52,680. The city forms the core of and is the principal city in the La Crosse–Onalaska Metropolitan Area, which includes all of La Crosse County and Houston County, Minnesota, with a population of 139,627.

A regional technology, medical, education, manufacturing, and transportation hub, companies based in the La Crosse area include Organic Valley, Logistics Health Incorporated, Kwik Trip, La Crosse Technology, City Brewing Company, and Trane. 

La Crosse is a college town with over 20,000 students and home to the University of Wisconsin-La Crosse, Viterbo University, and Western Technical College.

History

The first Europeans to see the region were French fur traders who traveled the Mississippi River in the late 17th century. There is no written record of any visit to the site until 1805, when Lt. Zebulon Pike mounted an expedition up the Mississippi River for the United States. Pike recorded the location's name as "Prairie La Crosse". The name originated from the game with sticks that resembled a bishop's crozier or la crosse in French, which was played by Native Americans there.

In 1841, the first white settlement at La Crosse was established when Nathan Myrick, a New York native, moved to the village at Prairie du Chien, Wisconsin to work in the fur trade. Myrick was disappointed to find that because many fur traders were already well-entrenched there, there were no openings for him in the trade. As a result, he decided to establish a trading post upriver at the then still unsettled site of Prairie La Crosse. In 1841, he built a temporary trading post on Barron Island (now called Pettibone Park), which lies just west of La Crosse's present downtown. The following year, Myrick relocated the post to the mainland prairie, partnering with H. J. B. Miller to run the outfit.

The spot Myrick chose to build his trading post proved ideal for settlement. It was near the junction of the Black, La Crosse, and Mississippi Rivers. In addition, the post was built at one of the few points along the Wisconsin side of the Mississippi River where a broad plain, ideal for development, existed between the river's bank and the tall bluffs that line the river valley. Because of these advantages, a small village grew around Myrick's trading post in the 1840s.

In 1844, a small Mormon community settled at La Crosse, building several dozen cabins a few miles (kilometers) south of Myrick's post. Although these settlers relocated away from the Midwest after just a year, the land they occupied near La Crosse continues to bear the name Mormon Coulee.

On June 23, 1850, Father James Lloyd Breck of the Episcopal Church said the first Christian liturgy on top of Grandad Bluff. Today, a monument to that event stands atop the bluff, near the parking lot at a scenic overlook.

More permanent development took place closer to Myrick's trading post, where stores, a hotel, and a post office were constructed during the 1840s. Under the direction of Timothy Burns, lieutenant governor of Wisconsin, surveyor William Hood platted the village in 1851. This opened it up for further settlement, which was achieved rapidly as a result of promotion of the city in eastern newspapers. By 1855, La Crosse had grown in population to nearly 2,000 residents, leading to its incorporation in 1856. The city grew even more rapidly after 1858 with the completion of the La Crosse & Milwaukee Railroad, the second railroad connecting Milwaukee to the Mississippi River.

During the second half of the 19th century, La Crosse grew to become one of the largest cities in Wisconsin. It was a center of the lumber industry, for logs cut in the interior of the state could be rafted down the Black River toward sawmills built in the city. La Crosse also became a center for the brewing industry and other manufacturers that saw advantages in the city's location adjacent to major transportation arteries, such as the Mississippi River and the railroad between Milwaukee and St. Paul, Minnesota.

Around the turn of the 20th century, the city became a center for education, with three colleges and universities established in the city between 1890 and 1912. Similar to cities across the country, La Crosse saw population stagnation in the latter half of the 20th century as a result of suburbanization.  Since 1966, La Crosse has seen its population grow by 10.73%, while its area, miles of sewer, and miles of water mains each grew by more than 50%.

In 2016, Mayor Tim Kabat and former Mayor John Medinger issued a proclamation apologizing for La Crosse's history as a sundown town that discriminated against African Americans.

La Crosse remains the largest city on Wisconsin's western border, and the educational institutions in the city have recently led it toward becoming a regional technology and medical hub.

Geography

La Crosse is located on the western border of the midsection of Wisconsin, on a broad alluvial plain along the east side of the Mississippi River. The Black River empties into the Mississippi north of the city, and the La Crosse River flows into the Mississippi just north of the downtown area. Just upriver from its mouth, this river broadens into a marshland that splits the city into two distinct sections, north and south.

Surrounding the relatively flat prairie valley where La Crosse lies are towering  bluffs, one of the most prominent of which is Grandad Bluff (mentioned in Life on the Mississippi by Mark Twain), which has an overlook of the three states region. This feature typifies the topography of the Driftless Area in which La Crosse sits. This rugged region is composed of high ridges dissected by narrow valleys called coulees, a French term. As a result, the area around La Crosse is frequently referred to as the "Coulee Region".

Climate
La Crosse's location in the United States' Upper Midwest gives the area a temperate, continental climate.

Neighborhoods and districts

La Crosse has 13 voting districts (wards). Neighborhoods within the city include:
Bluffside
Washburn
Historic Cass & King
Powell-Poage-Hamilton
Historic downtown
Northside (Upper and Lower) and Old Towne North
Grandview Emerson
Weigent Hogan
Hintgen
College Park (UW–La Crosse campus district)
Springbrook Clayton Johnson

Suburbs of the city include: French Island in the Town of Campbell, Holmen, the Town of Medary, City of Onalaska, La Crescent, Minnesota, and the Town of Shelby.

Area

Demographics

2020 census
As of the census of 2020, the population was 52,680. The population living in college or university student housing was 3,897. The racial makeup of the city was 85.6% White, 4.9% Asian, 2.9% Black or African American, 0.5% Native American, 1.2% from other races, and 4.9% from two or more races. Ethnically, the population was 3.2% Hispanic or Latino of any race. 

According to the American Community Survey estimates for 2016–2020, the median income for a household in the city was $46,438, and the median income for a family was $66,928. Male full-time workers had a median income of $43,438 versus $37,215 for female workers. The per capita income for the city was $27,398. About 7.9% of families and 22.9% of the population were below the poverty line, including 13.6% of those under age 18 and 10.9% of those age 65 or over. Of the population age 25 and over, 93.9% were high school graduates or higher and 36.5% had a bachelor's degree or higher.

2010 census
At the 2010 census, there were 51,320 people, 21,428 households and 9,691 families residing in the city. The population density was 2,501.5 per square mile (965.6/km2). There were 22,628 housing units at an average density of 1,102.7 per square mile (425.8/km2). The racial makeup of the city was 89.8% White, 2.3% African American, 0.6% Native American, 4.9% Asian, 0.0% Pacific Islander, 0.4% from other races, and 2.1% from two or more races. Hispanic or Latino of any race were 2.0% of the population.

There were 21,428 households, of which 19.5% had children under the age of 18 living with them, 31.6% were married couples living together, 9.7% had a female householder with no husband present, and 54.8% were non-families. 37.7% of all households were composed of individuals, and 11.7% had someone living alone who was 65 years of age or older. The average household size was 2.18 and the average family size was 2.86.

16.2% of the population were under the age of 18, 26.5% from 18 to 24, 23.1% from 25 to 44, 21.0% from 45 to 64, and 13.1% who were 65 years of age or older. The median age was 30 years. For every 100 females, there were 89.0 males. For every 100 females age 18 and over, there were 89.4 males.

Religion

The city has a variety of religious traditions and communities, including Catholicism, Protestantism, Anglicanism, Eastern Orthodox, Judaism, Unitarian Universalism, and Islam.

La Crosse is the episcopal see for the Roman Catholic Diocese of La Crosse. The Cathedral of Saint Joseph the Workman serves as the seat of the Diocese. The city is also home to St. Rose of Viterbo Convent, the mother house of the Franciscan Sisters of Perpetual Adoration, and the Shrine of Our Lady of Guadalupe. An independent catholic school district in the city, La Crosse Aquinas Catholic Schools, is also overseen by the diocese.

Protestant churches in the city include Lutheran, Baptist, Methodist, Vineyard, Presbyterian, and independent traditions. The Wisconsin Evangelical Lutheran Synod has five churches in La Crosse: First Lutheran Church, Grace Lutheran Church, Immanuel Lutheran Church, Mt. Calvary Lutheran Church, and St. John's Lutheran Church.

Christ Church of La Crosse, the city's Episcopal church, is listed on the National Register of Historic Places. St. Elias Antiochian Orthodox Church, the city's Eastern Orthodox Church, is listed on the city's local register of Historic places.

Other religious groups within the city include: the Congregation Sons of Abraham, a Jewish synagogue; the Unitarian Universalist Fellowship of La Crosse, which has held services since 1951; the Islamic Society Othman Bin Afaan; and the Hmong Faith Alliance Church.

Economy
La Crosse is the home and current global headquarters of several corporations and organizations, including:
Allergy Associates of La Crosse and Allergychoices, Inc., national allergy clinic and allergy services organization
Altra Federal Credit Union, regional credit union
City Brewing Company, former Heileman Old Style brewery
Franciscan Skemp Medical Center, health care network with flagship campus in La Crosse
Gundersen Health System, health care network with flagship campus in La Crosse
Kwik Trip, regional gas and convenience stores
La Crosse Technology, manufacturer of atomic clocks and weather stations
Marine Credit Union, regional credit union

Corporations founded and formerly headquartered in La Crosse include:
Cargill, America's now largest privately held corporation founded in La Crosse
La Croix Sparkling Water, carbonated drink originally created by the G. Heileman Brewing Company 
LaCrosse Footwear, footwear company founded in 1897
Trane, international air conditioning, acquired by Ingersoll-Rand in 2008

Largest employers
 the 10 largest employers in La Crosse were:

Gundersen Health System
Mayo Clinic Health System (Franciscan Skemp Medical Center)
Trane
Kwik Trip
La Crosse County
School District of La Crosse
University of Wisconsin–La Crosse
Logistics Health Incorporated
City of La Crosse
Western Technical College

Shopping

La Crosse and the surrounding communities form a regional commercial center and shopping hub. In the northeastern region of the city lies the area's largest shopping center, Valley View Mall. The surrounding area includes numerous big-box stores, and many restaurants. Other shopping centers in the La Crosse region include Three Rivers Plaza, Marsh View Center, Shelby Mall, Jackson Plaza, Bridgeview Plaza, and the Village Shopping Center. Downtown La Crosse has experienced a resurgence in recent years, providing shopping, farmers' markets, hotels, restaurants, and specialty shops.

Arts and culture
La Crosse has over 30 active arts organizations. The Pump House Regional Arts Center hosts visual arts exhibits throughout the year plus its own series of jazz, folk, and blues performers. The La Crosse Symphony is the city's regional orchestra and the La Crosse Community Theater has won both regional and national acclaim. The city is home to the Blue Stars Drum and Bugle Corps, a member of Drum Corps International. Other arts sites include Viterbo University Fine Arts building, UW–La Crosse Art Gallery and Theater, and the La Crosse Center, which hosts national performers. Local sculptor Elmer Petersen has created sculptures that are exhibited throughout the downtown area, including La Crosse Players and the Eagle in Riverside Park. It also hosts a yearly St Patrick's Day Parade as well as Irishfest La Crosse in August

The La Crosse Center, a convention center and arena located in downtown La Crosse on the Mississippi River, hosts a variety of sporting events, concerts, exhibits, and shows. The city annually hosts Oktoberfest USA, an Oktoberfest celebration first established in 1961.

Parks and recreation

Sport
The La Crosse Loggers of the Northwoods League, play baseball at their home field at Copeland Park on the north side of La Crosse in the summer months. In 2017, the La Crosse Showtime began play in the American Basketball Association at La Crosse Center. In the past, the La Crosse Center has been home to the Catbirds and the Bobcats of the CBA, as well as the River Rats of the IFL, the Spartans of the IFL and the Night Train of the NIFL. In the winter season, the Coulee Region Chill was a junior team in the North American 3 Hockey League at the Green Island Ice Arena. Additionally, the area's only ski hill, Mt. La Crosse, opened in 1959 and has 18 slopes and trails. The ski hill is home to Damnation!, Mid-America's steepest trail.

The University of Wisconsin–La Crosse's Eagles compete in NCAA Division III. The university's 10,000 seat Veterans Memorial Field for football (turf field) and outdoor timed track opened in 2009 and hosts the WIAA Wisconsin high school outdoor track and field state championships.

The La Crosse Fairgrounds Speedway, located in nearby West Salem, is the first and only paved NASCAR-sanctioned asphalt stock car racing track in Wisconsin.

Parks

Riverside Park is situated on the riverfront of downtown La Crosse near the Blue Bridges. It hosts events such as Riverfest, Fourth of July fireworks, Oktoberfest, and the Rotary Lights. Several steamboats make stops along the river in the park, including the American Queen, La Crosse Queen, and Julia Belle Swain. The park has walking/running trails. The park was previously home to a controversial Statue of Hiawatha. Long standing public debate about whether the statue was offensive or presented a caricature based on stereotypes of Native Americans eventually led to its removal in 2020, nearly 60 years after it was erected.

Pettibone Park is located on Baron Island, across the river from Riverside Park and the downtown area. The island was originally part of the state of Minnesota. The land was transferred to Wisconsin and eventually the City of La Crosse following a border dispute that was resolved in 1919. Today the park has a variety of recreational facilities, including a beach and disc golf course.

An extensive marsh, a natural floodplain created by the La Crosse River, divides the city between north and south. The area is protected as an important wildlife habitat and watershed to the Mississippi River. Several biking and walking paths cross through the marshland which is also used for canoeing, fishing and trapping. On the southern end of the marsh lies Myrick Park. The park was named after the city's first European settler: Nathan Myrick. It has many recreational amenities as well as a nature center and environmental education department. Hunting and fishing are very popular all seasons of the year and the Mississippi and other rivers, sloughs, creeks, lakes, the Upper Mississippi River Wildlife Refuge and hilltops and valleys with public woodlands are available to sportsmen and families.

Government

The city government employs a weak mayor form of the mayor-council system. The mayor is elected at-large, while the 13 members of the Common Council are elected per aldermanic districts. Mitch Reynolds defeated Vicki Markussen in the 2021 La Crosse Mayoral election, succeeding retiring incumbent Tim Kabat. Kabat served as Mayor from 2013 to 2021.

Both the city and county of La Crosse have voted Democratic in every presidential election since 1988. In the 2016 Presidential Election, Hillary Clinton won by 52% of the City of La Crosse. In the 2012 presidential election, Barack Obama won 65% of the city of La Crosse and 58% of La Crosse County. In 2014, the Milwaukee Journal Sentinel ranked La Crosse as one of Wisconsin's top performing Democratic cities.

In the United States Congress, Republican Derrick Van Orden has represented La Crosse as part of Wisconsin's 3rd congressional district since 2023. The city is almost coterminous with the 95th Wisconsin State Assembly District and is represented by Democrat Jill Billings. Additionally, Democrat Steve Doyle currently represents suburban La Crosse County in the 94th Assembly District. La Crosse is part of the State Senate District 32 and is represented by Democrat Brad Pfaff.

Mayors
Source:

Education

The La Crosse area is served by the School District of La Crosse, which as of 2022, has a total enrollment of 6,139 students. As of 2021, the district has 16 separate facilities, providing a total of 20 elementary, middle, high, and charter school programs. In 2021, the school district proposed to consolidate the district's largest high schools, Central High School and Logan High School, into a new facility. A 2022 referendum will decide whether this plan is carried through.

Catholic private schools in La Crosse include La Crosse Aquinas Catholic Schools, a Roman Catholic school district affiliated with the Diocese of La Crosse, which includes Aquinas High School and Aquinas Middle School. Another Roman Catholic school, the Providence Academy, is independent from the district and has no affiliation with the Diocese.

Lutheran private schools in La Crosse include First Lutheran School, Immanuel Lutheran School, and Mt. Calvary-Grace Lutheran School, which are part of the La Crosse Area Lutheran Schools organization and affiliated with the Wisconsin Evangelical Lutheran Synod. The region's largest Lutheran high school, Luther High School is located in Onalaska, Wisconsin.

La Crosse is the home of three regional colleges and universities. The University of Wisconsin–La Crosse is the region's leading public university. Western Technical College is a public community college located in the city. La Crosse is also home to Viterbo University, a Roman Catholic private institution. The Health Science Center exists as a combined effort of all the La Crosse medical centers, universities, and government agencies with a goal of advancing students in the medical fields.

Media

Print
La Crosse's largest newspaper is the daily La Crosse Tribune which serves the Wisconsin, Minnesota, and Iowa regions. Free weekly tabloids include the Foxxy Shopper and the Buyer's Express. The Racquet is the University of Wisconsin-La Crosse's free weekly paper.

Coulee Parenting Connection is a magazine serving families in the La Crosse area. Coulee Region Women is a magazine serving the community.

Television

AM radio

FM radio

Infrastructure

Airport

The La Crosse Regional Airport, located on French Island, provides direct scheduled passenger service to Minneapolis, Detroit, and Chicago through Delta Air Lines link Endeavor Air, as well as American Airlines link Envoy Air. Sun Country and Xtra Airways provide charter service to Laughlin, Elko, Nevada, and other destinations. The airport also serves general aviation for the La Crosse region.

Roads
The city is served by several major highways and Interstate, including Interstate 90, U.S. Highway 14, U.S. Highway 53, U.S. Highway 61, Wisconsin State Highway 35, Wisconsin State Highway 16, and Wisconsin State Highway 33.

The Mississippi River Bridge, also known as the Cass St. bridge and the newer Cameron Street bridge (photo with blue arch) both connect downtown La Crosse with La Crescent, Minnesota. These two bridges cross the Mississippi River, as does the Interstate 90 bridge located just northwest of La Crosse, connecting Wisconsin and Minnesota.

Walking and Cycling

In 2012, the City of La Crosse was the first city in Wisconsin to pass a Green Complete Streets ordinance. This ordinance requires that when roads are reconstructed the needs of stormwater management and the safety of bicycles and pedestrians are taken into account in the new design. The same year, the city passed the Bicycle and Pedestrian Master Plan to guide improvements to the transportation network for those walking or cycling in the city.

As of 2021, however, La Crosse had no protected bike lanes, while bike infrastructure has generally gone unmaintained through the winter months.

A new bikeshare system debuted in downtown La Crosse in April 2021 through a partnership of La Crosse Neighborhoods, Inc and Koloni, an Iowa based bikeshare company.  It is hoped that this service will be expanded across the city in the near future. There are currently 8 bikeshare stations and 40 bikes available for use.

The interstate Mississippi River Trail passes through La Crosse. However, the trail does not follow a dedicated multi-use path. The La Crosse River Trail and the Great River State Trail pass through the northern edge of the city. These trails combine to form one continuous trail from Trempealeau to Reedsburg. They are rail trails built on the former roadbed of the Chicago and Northwestern Railway.

Public Transit
Main Articles: La Crosse Municipal Transit Utility, Scenic Mississippi Regional Transit

Public transit in La Crosse began with the opening of a horse-drawn streetcar line in 1878.  Over time, more streetcar lines were added, and by 1893, all streetcars had been electrified.  Beginning in the early 20th century, however, increasing car ownership led to a decline of the privately run streetcar system.  As a result, buses began to replace streetcars throughout the city. By November 1945, the last streetcar line closed. The City of La Crosse took over operations of the buses in the 1970s from the Mississippi Valley Public Service Company, as the buses could no longer be operated profitably.

In 1945, in the first timetable after streetcar service had ended, there were four bus routes.  The earliest bus left at 5:40 am and the last bus returned at 1:00 am. Buses ran at a 10 to 15-minute headway throughout the day. In total, the buses provided 1519.95 hours of service per week.  Today, in 2021, the MTU provides only 1141.6 hours of service per week, a decline of 24.89%.

The City of La Crosse's MTU bus service with routes reaching out to the suburbs served over one million users in 2007. As of 2021, the MTU operates 11 routes with the earliest buses beginning their routes at 5:12 am and running until 10:40 pm at the latest.

In addition to the MTU, a regional bus service, Scenic Mississippi Regional Transit, provides service to Prairie du Chien, Viroqua, Tomah, and points in-between.  The service has four routes, which only run on weekdays.

Waterways
On the Mississippi River, cargo is transported to and from this area to St Paul and St Louis, using towboats, primarily moving dry bulk cargo barges for coal, grain, and other low-value bulk goods.

Rail transport

The first rail line to reach La Crosse arrived in 1858 from Milwaukee constructed by the Milwaukee & La Crosse Railroad. This later became the main line of the Milwaukee Road.  After the Milwaukee Road went bankrupt it became part of the Soo Line Railroad in 1985 and later came under the control of Canadian Pacific Railway.  This line provides the track on which the La Crosse Amtrak station is located, served daily by the Empire Builder between Chicago and Seattle or Portland. As of 2021, funding has been secured to provide a second daily train from Chicago to St. Paul, stopping in La Crosse. This service is anticipated to begin in 2024.

Railroad tracks owned by Burlington Northern and Santa Fe Railway (BNSF) pass through La Crosse providing freight service. These were originally built by the Chicago, Burlington & Quincy Railroad in 1886 to connect Chicago to the Twin Cities following the east bank of the Mississippi River.  This line provided passenger service as well up until May 1, 1971, when Amtrak took over intercity passenger rail operations.

Intercity Bus

Jefferson Lines serves La Crosse with one daily bus running from Minneapolis to Milwaukee via Rochester and Madison. In addition, Badger Bus offers service on Fridays and Sundays during the school year between Madison and Minneapolis via La Crosse. Both Jefferson Lines and Badger Bus make stops at the University of Wisconsin-La Crosse Student Union, while Jefferson Lines also stops at the downtown Grand River Station transit hub.

Drinking Water
La Crosse's tap drinking water, which is raised from a deep underground Artesian aquifer, won the best natural tasting water award in September 2007 in a statewide tasting competition hosted by the Wisconsin Water Association. The city competed against groundwater and surface water utilities from Algoma, Appleton, Green Bay, Madison, Milwaukee, Pell Lake, Shawano, Shawano Lake and Watertown at the annual meeting of the association. La Crosse's drinking water is pumped from deep ground wells to a distribution center and is treated with chlorine and fluoride; some wells are also treated with polyphosphate.

In recent years, the city discovered PFAS in the groundwater on French Island, WI as a result of fire fighting foam used at the La Crosse Regional Airport. This has led to the closure of two municipal wells, as well as prevented residents of parts of the Town of Campbell, WI from safely using their private wells. Over 500 wells on French Island have been contaminated and the State of Wisconsin has supplied bottled water to the affected residents.

Health care
Two major regional health care facilities are located in La Crosse: Gundersen Health System and the Franciscan Skemp Medical Center.

Gundersen Health System is a nationally ranked health care system located in La Crosse that is also an ACS nationally certified Level II Trauma Center. It is the primary hospital associated with the Gundersen Clinic medical group and the location of the Western campus for the University of Wisconsin Medical School. With its main campus located in La Crosse, the system also manages 23 locations throughout Wisconsin, Minnesota and Iowa with nearly 6,000 employees. In 2014, Gundersen Health received the Healthgrades America's 50 Best Hospitals™ designation, placing the system among the top 1 percent of hospitals nationwide.

The Franciscan Skemp Medical Center is an affiliate of the Mayo Clinic. Franciscan Skemp, which was the first western Wisconsin hospital to open its doors in 1883 as St. Francis Hospital, was started by the Catholic Franciscan Sisters of Perpetual Adoration, who still are associated with the medical center. In 1995, Franciscan Skemp merged with Mayo Clinic Health Systems in Rochester, Minnesota, located 60 miles away. A new trauma and emergency department, helicopter pad, and surgery wing recently opened in 2007.

The Health Science Center, located on the University of Wisconsin–La Crosse campus, is a combined effort of both medical centers, UW–La Crosse, Viterbo University, Western College, the School District of La Crosse, and various government educational groups. The purpose was to prepare and train students for advancement in the medical field.

Notable people

Sister cities
La Crosse has sister city relationships with seven foreign towns and cities:
 Bantry, County Cork, Ireland
 Dubna, Moscow Oblast, Russia
 Épinal, Vosges, Grand Est, France
 Friedberg, Bavaria, Germany
 Førde, Norway
Luxembourg Junglinster, Luxembourg
 Kumbo, Cameroon
 Luoyang, Henan, China

See also
La Crosse area radio stations
La Crosse area television stations
Old Style Beer

References

Bibliography
 Crocker, Leslie F. Places and Spaces: A Century of Public Buildings, Bridges and Parks in La Crosse, Wisconsin. La Crosse, Wis. 2012.
 Marcou, David J. (ed.) Spirit of La Crosse: A Grassroots History. La Crosse, Wis.: Western Wisconsin Technical College, 2000.
 Morser, Eric J. Hinterland Dreams: The Political Economy of a Midwestern City. Philadelphia: University of Pennsylvania Press, 2011.

External links

La Crosse Area Chamber of Commerce
La Crosse Area Convention & Visitors Bureau

La Crosse, Wisconsin
Cities in Wisconsin
Cities in La Crosse County, Wisconsin
Wisconsin populated places on the Mississippi River
County seats in Wisconsin
Populated places established in 1841
1841 establishments in Wisconsin Territory
Sundown towns in Wisconsin